Experimental Lung Research is a peer-reviewed medical journal that publishes original articles in all fields of respiratory tract anatomy, biology, developmental biology, toxicology, and pathology. The editor-in-chief is Mark Giembycz (Department of Pharmacology and Therapeutics, University of Calgary). According to the Journal Citation Reports, the journal has a 2010 impact factor of 1.069, ranking it 38th out of 46 journals in the category "Respiratory System".

References

External links 
 

Publications established in 1980
Pulmonology journals